Ballyvade is a townland in County Westmeath, Ireland.

Ballyvade is one of 15 townlands of the civil parish of Leny in the barony of Corkaree in the Province of Leinster. The neighbouring townlands are: Cullenhugh and Leny to the north, Rathaniska to the east and Farrow to the south and west.

In the 1911 census of Ireland there was 1 house and 5 inhabitants in the townland.

References

External links
Ballyvade at the IreAtlas Townland Data Base
Ballyvade at Townlands.ie
Ballyvade at Logainm.ie

Townlands of County Westmeath